1st Zirimzibash (1-se Yeremyäbaş) is a rural locality (a village) in Kurdymsky Selsoviet of Tatyshlinsky District, Russia. The population was 106 as of 2010.

Geography 
1st Zirimzibash is located 23 km west of Verkhniye Tatyshly (the district's administrative centre) by road. Stary Kurdym is the nearest rural locality.

Ethnicity 
The village is inhabited by Bashkirs and other ethnic groups.

Streets 
 Lesnaya
 Tsentralnaya

References

External links 
 1st Zirimzibash on travellers.ru
 Council of Municipalities of the Republic of Bashkortostan

Rural localities in Tatyshlinsky District